Palazzo Dandolo Paolucci is a Renaissance palace in Venice, Italy, located in the San Polo district and overlooking the Grand Canal. The palazzo neighbors Palazzo Dolfin and Palazzo Civran Grimani.

History
The present palace was built in the 17th century on the site of a previous Gothic building of the 14th century. The palace was heavily remodeled in later periods. A large terrace with a balustrade was added on top in 1924. Dandolo is the name of a Doge family. Palazzo Dandolo belonged to the Paolucci family in the 18th century.

Architecture
The palace has four levels with two noble floors in the middle. They are decorated by quadriforas slightly shifted to the right and flanked by pairs of single-light windows. The ground floor has two water portals; this feature testifies to the two-family use of the building. The palazzo has a modern terrace, located on the top floor, above the eaves line.

Gallery

See also
Palazzo Dandolo

References

Houses completed in the 17th century
Dandolo Paolucci
Dandolo Paolucci
Renaissance architecture in Venice